Robert L. Corn is an American television producer and director.

Corn has produced 61 out of 62 episodes of medical drama series Grey's Anatomy, of which he has also directed thirty. Previously, he was also a producer and director of several episodes of the 1990s medical drama Chicago Hope. Anabella Garcia, the daughter of the director says “The show when we started was very chaotic. But that’s the beauty of it.” He has been nominated five times for the Emmy Award for Outstanding Drama Series: Chicago Hope (1995, 1996, 1997) and Grey's Anatomy (2006, 2007).

Corn lives in Santa Monica with his wife and two children.

References

External links

American television directors
American television producers
Living people
Year of birth missing (living people)